Ernst Leonhardt (September 25, 1885 – March 26, 1945) was an American-born Swiss military figure and pro-Nazi Germany politician.

Biography 

Ernst Leonhardt was born to a German-born Swiss father on September 25, 1885 in Tracy City, Grundy County, Tennessee, United States. Leonhardt moved to Switzerland at an early age to attend school at Basel, before joining the Swiss Army, where he rose to the rank of major.

Leonhardt became involved in politics in 1932 when he joined the National Front, and before long he had risen to the rank of Gauführer (equivalent to Gauleiter) in both Basel-City and the Canton of Solothurn. However he clashed with his superiors and in 1933 he left the Front and set up his own Volksbund with fellow dissident Emil Sonderegger. The group was dominated by the forceful personality of Leonhardt, a strong factor in its failure to attract much of a following.

Although Leonhardt continued to be involved in Swiss pro-Nazi movements, he had in fact relocated to Germany in 1939 and continued his activism from there. He worked closely with Burri to distribute Nazi propaganda into Switzerland, whilst also recruiting volunteers for the SS and arguing for an Anschluss-style takeover of Switzerland by Hitler. Leonhardt's Swiss citizenship was revoked in 1943 due to this idea. In his absence, the Swiss courts found Leonhardt guilty of attacking the Swiss Confederation's independence and illegally recruiting for a foreign military (i. e. the SS), sentencing him to fifteen and a half years in prison. However, he remained free in Germany for the rest of his life, continuing to produce propaganda. He was killed in an air raid on March 26, 1945 in Oberndorf am Neckar, Rottweil (district), Baden-Württemberg, Germany.

See also 
Berne Trial

References

External links
Courtroom Battle of World War II (Part 1 of 3). contains information on the careers and fates of some of the Nazi collaborators.
Courtroom Battles of World War II (Part 2 of 3).
Courtroom Battles of World War II (Part 3 of 3).

1885 births
1945 deaths
American emigrants to Switzerland
American collaborators with Nazi Germany
American anti-communists
American fascists
American prisoners and detainees
Deaths by airstrike during World War II
Nazi propagandists
People from Tracy City, Tennessee
National Front (Switzerland) politicians
Swiss military officers
Swiss collaborators with Nazi Germany
Swiss Nazis
Swiss anti-communists
Swiss emigrants to Germany
American civilians killed in World War II
German civilians killed in World War II